The 42nd Thailand National Games (Thai: การแข่งขันกีฬาแห่งชาติ ครั้งที่ 42 "สุพรรณบุรีเกมส์", also known as the 2013 National Games and the Suphan Buri Games) were held in Suphan Buri, Thailand from 5 to 15 January 2014, involving 44 sports and 77 disciplines. These games were held in Suphan Buri Provincial Sport Center and Suphan Buri Sport School Stadium. Nakhon Ratchasima also hosted the 1994 and the 2006 Thailand National Games.

Marketing

Emblem
His Majesty King Naresuan riding on his royal war elephant beat His Majesty King of Burma with Don Chedi Memorial.

Mascot 
The mascots Ma Si Mok. The dark gray horse in Khun Chang Khun Phaen.

Ceremony

Opening ceremony
The opening ceremony was held on January 5, 2014 at Suphan Buri Provincial Stadium with performances from the Suphanburi Symphonic Band and a special football match between Suphanburi FC and Muang Thong United.

Closing ceremony
The closing ceremony was held on January 15, 2014 at Suphan Buri Provincial Stadium with a handover of the flag to Nakhon Ratchasima, the host 2014 Thailand National Games.

Provinces participating

 
 Ang Thong
 
 
 
 Chachoengsao
 Chai Nat
 Chaiyaphum
 
 
 
 Chonburi
 Chumphon
 Kalasin
 
 
 Khon Kaen
 Krabi
 
 Lamphun
 
 Lopburi
 Mae Hong Son
 Maha Sarakham
 Mukdahan
 Nakhon Nayok
 
 Nakhon Phanom
 
 Nakhon Sawan
 
 
 Narathiwat
 
 Nong Khai
 Nonthaburi
 Pathum Thani
 
 Phang Nga
 
 
 Phetchabun
 
 
 
 Phra Nakhon Si Ayutthaya
 Phrae
 Phuket
 
 
 Ranong
 Ratchaburi
 Rayong
 Roi Et
 Sa Kaeo
 Sakon Nakhon
 Samut Prakan
 Samut Sakhon
 Samut Songkhram
 Saraburi
 
 
 
 Songkhla
 Sukhothai
  (Host)
 Surat Thani
 
 
 Trang
 
 
 
 
 Uttaradit
 Yala
 Yasothon

Sports

Air sports
Archery
Athletics
Badminton
Basketball
Baseball
Billiards and snooker
Bodybuilding
Bridge
Boxing
Cricket
Cycling
Dancesport
Extreme sports
Equestrian
Field hockey
Football
Futsal
Gymnastics
Go
Golf
Handball
Judo
Kabaddi
Karate
Muay Thai
Netball
Petanque
Pencak silat
Rugby football
Rowing
Sepak takraw
Shooting
Softball
Soft tennis
Swimming
Table tennis
Taekwondo
Tennis
Volleyball
Weightlifting
Woodball
Wrestling
Wushu

Medal tally

External links
Official website of the 42nd Thailand National Games in Suphan Buri

National Games
Thailand National Games
National Games
Thailand National Games
National Games